Paola Tirados Sánchez (born 14 January 1980 in Las Palmas de Gran Canaria, Canary Islands) is a Spanish synchronized swimmer. She has competed at the 2000, 2004 and 2008 Summer Olympics.

Notes

References

 The Official Website of the Beijing 2008 Olympic Games
 Sports-Reference.com biography

1980 births
Living people
Spanish synchronized swimmers
Olympic medalists in synchronized swimming
Olympic synchronized swimmers of Spain
Olympic silver medalists for Spain
Synchronized swimmers at the 2000 Summer Olympics
Synchronized swimmers at the 2004 Summer Olympics
Synchronized swimmers at the 2008 Summer Olympics
Medalists at the 2008 Summer Olympics
World Aquatics Championships medalists in synchronised swimming
Synchronized swimmers at the 2003 World Aquatics Championships
Synchronized swimmers at the 2005 World Aquatics Championships
Synchronized swimmers at the 2007 World Aquatics Championships
Sportspeople from Las Palmas